Guilderland Cemetery Vault is a historic burial vault located in Guilderland Cemetery at Guilderland in Albany County, New York.  It was built in 1872 and is a small one story cobblestone building.  It is built of coursed cobblestones with smooth ashlar quoins and rounded arch door.

It was listed on the National Register of Historic Places in 1982.

References

Cemeteries on the National Register of Historic Places in New York (state)
Buildings and structures completed in 1872
Cobblestone architecture
Cemeteries in Albany County, New York
National Register of Historic Places in Albany County, New York